Belton Court (also known as Ferrin Hall, Barrington College, Gibson Memorial Building, and Peck Mansion) is a historic estate on Middle Highway in Barrington, Rhode Island. The mansion was built for Frederick Stanhope Peck, a businessman, socialite, and Rhode Island political figure. Later in the twentieth century, the mansion and surrounding property served as the campus for Barrington College and the Zion Bible Institute.

At its peak, Belton Court served as the mansion for the 800-acre Peck estate. Encompassing roughly 55,000 square feet, the mansion was constructed over the course of thirty years from 1905 to 1928. The initial 1905 segment (the current eastern wing) was designed by Martin & Hall, an esteemed Providence architectural firm. The expansive 1927–1928 north and west additions were designed by George Frederic Hall, that firm's successor.

The building was added to the National Register of Historic Places in 1976. Since 2011, Belton Court and the surrounding structures have been predominately vacant.

History 
Frederick Peck's first American ancestor was Joseph Peck who immigrated to Hingham, Massachusetts in 1636. With captain Myles Standish, Governor William Bradford and others, Joseph Peck purchased a tract of land located between Narragansett Bay and the Taunton River in 1641 from Massasoit (or Ousamequin Sachem). Nathaniel Peck, Joseph's son, settled on part of this land in Barrington which he called Ousamequin Farm.  This property remained in the family homestead into the twentieth century. Before Ousamequin Farm descended to Frederick Peck on his father's death, he purchased an adjacent piece of land with the intention to erect a stone residence for which he would name Belton Court for the early home of the Pecks in England.

Architecture 
The first wing of the building was put up between 1905 and 1906, with its main elevation facing east onto Middle Highway. Two-and-a-half stories in height, the house was built of rough masonry granite with segmental relieving arches over the windows and doors. With Peck's expanding interests and activities, a larger residence was constructed between 1927 and 1928 north and west of the original section, forming a U-shaped court facing south; this major addition was more medieval in appearance but maintains the basic massing, height, and materials of the 1905 unit. At the northeast corner, a four-story, crenellated tower, formally containing a water tank, dominates the complex to this day. As of 2022, the tower currently houses an AT&T transmitter that is powered by an external cable.

Art and collections 
Belton Court was as much of a museum as it was a private residence. Peck devoted as much energy to his avocation of book and manuscript collecting as to his business and political career; he was deeply interested in New England history. When sold at auction in 1944, his book collection numbered 8,000 volumes, expensively bound and in excellent condition.  Representative high points were the first four folios of Shakespeare's plays and a first edition of Shakespeare's sonnets.

Peck's manuscript library was one of the finest private collections in the country at the time, it included multiple sets of signers of the Declaration of Independence, two complete sets of letters signed by presidents while in office, and a more unusual collection of letters by the wives of multiple presidents. His collection also notably included a collection of the letters and papers of George Washington and documents relating to Rhode Island, including letters of Roger Williams and an undated order from President Tyler to authorize the use of federal troops in the Dorr Rebellion.  Other areas of collecting interest included Roman and Phoenician glass, Native American artifacts, and eighteenth-century English portraiture.

Institutional use 
In 1944, Frederick Peck arranged to leave Belton Court to the Providence Homeopathic Hospital, of which he served as president for many years.  Peck would die in Providence on January 20, 1947.  The Belton Court property had been given to the Providence Homeopathic Hospital in 1944; however, the structures was considered unusable for hospital purposes and was sold to a developer. During the mid to late twentieth century, large portions of the former estate grounds that surrounded Belton Court were sold off for the development of single-family housing.  The mansion complex was first used by the Edgewood School and then acquired by the Providence Bible Institute in 1950.

Barrington College 

The Providence Bible Institute operated both Providence and Barrington campuses during the 1950s.  In 1960, the Providence campus was sold and integrated with the Barrington campus to form Barrington College.  Student housing and academic buildings were constructed on the surrounding property; the mansion was used for administrative offices and the library.  Due to financial and enrollment issues, Barrington College merged with Gordon College of Wenham, Massachusetts; the campus was subsequently put up for sale in 1985.

Zion Bible Institute 

The Zion Bible Institute, a Pentecostal ministry college, bought the campus for $5 million in 1985. The Zion Bible Institute would occupy the campus until moving to Bradford, Massachusetts in 2008; Zion would be the last tenant to occupy Belton Court. In 2007, the former campus was listed for sale at $13 million.

Abandonment and future uncertainty 

In 2011 a Massachusetts-based investor, ShineHarmony Holdings LLC, won a bid for Belton Court at auction for about $3.5 million and proposed to preserve the property and re-use it as elderly housing, assisted living, skilled nursing, and memory care. Despite this, development on the project was never initialized, with ShineHarmony officially abandoning the plan in 2017 and listing the property for sale. During this time, Belton Court and the campus structures had since been vacated.

Amenities were cut off to the mansion and campus structures; vandalism and neglect further damaged the buildings. With no active development on the site, many locals viewed the former campus site as a safety hazard, while preservationists called for the town of Barrington to hold the property owners accountable for the mansion's dilapidation. In 2020, many town officials expressed interest in rezoning the property for academic purposes or corporate offices.

In the spring of 2021, demolition of a porch attached to the 1905 section took place alongside the demolition of several heavily deteriorated campus structures. ShineHarmony reinstated their development plan for the property, albeit highly altered from the initial 2011 plan. In 2022, it was estimated that restoring Belton Court would cost over $10 million. The 2021 master plan approval for the Belton Court property expired in July 2022.

In September 2022, ShineHarmony indicated plans to pursue the demolition of Belton Court; many town officials and locals expressed major concern for the future preservation of the mansion. While Belton Court is a listed structure, it does not have protections against demolition by private owners; it does not reside in a historic district. In accordance with permit filings, ShineHarmony had intended to commence demolition by late September or early October. In early October, town officials announced that the mansion would not be demolished; rather, extensive stakeholder engagement and negotiations with the owners would occur over the coming months in regard to the mansion's future preservation.

In January 2023, ShineHarmony released an updated plan that called for a large scale residential development be constructed on the 36.9-acre parcel. The plan calls for the demolition of 85% of the mansion and the construction of over 350 housing units on the property. The development- referred as “Belton Court Village"- would also contain pocket parks, civic buildings, and small commercial spaces. The plan received overwhelmingly backlash from Barrington residents and town officials; preservation advocates blasted the plan for its proposed demolition of Belton Court. 

In March 2023, the town of Barrington unanimously approved a proposition to sell town property at the former Carmelite Monastery and use the proceeds to offset the acquisition of the former Barrington College property. As proposed, the grounds surrounding Belton Court would be converted into new athletic fields and a recreation center; additionally, a dedicated non-profit would be formed to manage the preservation and reuse of the Belton Court mansion.

See also 
 National Register of Historic Places listings in Bristol County, Rhode Island
 Barrington, Rhode Island
 List of largest houses in United States

References

External links

Buildings and structures in Barrington, Rhode Island
Houses in Bristol County, Rhode Island
Houses completed in 1905
Houses on the National Register of Historic Places in Rhode Island
National Register of Historic Places in Bristol County, Rhode Island
1905 establishments in Rhode Island